Waterlogging water is the saturation of soil with water. Soil may be regarded as waterlogged when it is nearly saturated with water much of the time such that its air phase is restricted and anaerobic conditions prevail. In extreme cases of prolonged waterlogging, anaerobiosis occurs, the roots of mesophytes suffer, and the subsurface reducing atmosphere leads to such processes as denitrification, methanogenesis, and the reduction of iron and manganese oxides.

All plants, including crops require air (specifically, oxygen) to respire, produce energy and keep their cells alive. In agriculture, waterlogging of the soil typically blocks air from getting in to the roots. With the exception of rice (Oryza sativa), most crops like maize and potato, are therefore highly intolerant to waterlogging. Plant cells use a variety of signals such the oxygen concentration, plant hormones like ethylene, energy and sugar status to acclimate to waterlogging-induced oxygen deprivation.

In irrigated agricultural land, waterlogging is often accompanied by soil salinity as waterlogged soils prevent leaching of the salts imported by the irrigation water.

From a gardening point of view, waterlogging is the process whereby the soil hardens to the point where neither air nor water can soak through.

See also
 Drainage
 Drainage research
 Drainage system (agriculture)
 Effects of weather on sport
 Environmental impact of irrigation
 Polder
 Soil salinity control
 Swamp
 Watertable control

References

External links
http://www.waterlog.info gives free downloads of software and articles on land drainage for waterlogging control.

Irrigation
Agricultural terminology